Sonya Belousova (born February 4, 1990) is a Russian-American film composer, pianist and recording artist who resides and works in Los Angeles, California. Belousova is a winner of international composition and piano competitions. Recognized as a child prodigy, at the age of 13 years Belousova was awarded with the Russian Ministry of Culture Award for her outstanding achievements in music composition.

Belousova is best known for her critically acclaimed work on Netflix's hit fantasy series The Witcher starring Henry Cavill. The Witcher Original Soundtrack Album, featuring songs and score composed and produced by Belousova and her scoring partner Giona Ostinelli, has achieved commercial success and critical recognition. The album debuted #1 on iTunes Top Soundtracks with the enormously successful hit single "Toss a Coin to Your Witcher" #1 on iTunes Top Soundtrack Songs and #1 on Billboard Digital Rock Songs Sales.  The album charted #4 on iTunes for Top Albums (behind only Eminem, Breaking Benjamin, and Chase Rice) and in the top ten in every major territory in the world. "Toss a Coin to Your Witcher" broke into the Billboard charts: Billboard Top Current Albums, Billboard Top Album Sales, Billboard Top Soundtrack Albums, and The Billboard 200. The song has quickly become a viral sensation and a worldwide phenomenon. The New York Post called it "the breakout hit," Thrillist "the biggest banger of 2020", Entertainment Weekly "a viral hit", Esquire "the best part of Netflix's series", The Verge "the hit song of the season", while Forbes stated that "the viral earworm became just as famous as the show".

Belousova has gained a wide public recognition for her award-winning project Player Piano (first introduced as Cosplay Piano from the executive producer Stan Lee of Marvel Comics). To date Player Piano has totaled over 24 million views and received an array of awards and honors. Belousova performed at her 2013 San Diego Comic Con panel introduced by Stan Lee, and made an appearance at the 2014 Anime Expo performing solo with a 70-piece orchestra and 30-piece choir.

Belousova is known for her work with the Festival Ballet Providence having been commissioned by the company to write three original ballets in collaboration with choreographer Viktor Plotnikov. She is also known for her collaboration with 27-time Grammy and 2-time Academy Award nominated producer and arranger Jorge Calandrelli.  

Belousova has performed in the largest venues of both her native Russia and the United States, including the Great Hall of Moscow Conservatory, Grand Hall of Saint Petersburg Philharmonia, Chamber Hall of Saint Petersburg Philharmonia, Saint Petersburg State Capella Concert Hall, Carnegie Hall, Jordan Hall, Skirball Cultural Center, Los Angeles Convention Center and San Diego Convention Center.

Early life and education 
Belousova was born in Saint Petersburg, Russia. She began her piano studies at the age of 5 and composition at the age of 10 under the instruction of renowned composer Zhanna Metallidi. At the age of 8 she made her debut at the stage of Chamber Hall of Saint Petersburg Philharmonia. At the age of 12 Belousova received a special prize for her original compositions at the Sergei Slonimsky Piano And Composition Competition. At the age of 13 Belousova won the International Valery Gavrilin Composition Competition with acclaimed composer Andrey Petrov, head of the jury and the St-Petersburg Union of Composers, personally awarding her with the prize. Belousova won the competition twice, in 2003 and 2004. Recognized as a child prodigy, in 2003 Belousova received the Russian Ministry of Culture Award for her outstanding achievements in music composition. In 2003 she participated in the Sound & Synthesis International Music Festival. In 2004 she won the first prize at the International Anton Rubinstein Piano Competition Miniatures In Russian Music.

Belousova continued her training in Moscow where she was accepted to Gnessin State Musical College at the age of 15. She received a dual bachelor's degree in music composition and piano performance. At the age of 17 she won the first prize at the Rodion Shchedrin Piano And Composition Competition. Belousova personally met with Maestro Shchedrin and his wife legendary ballerina Maya Plisetskaya as well as performed her award-winning composition at the stage of the Great Hall of Moscow Conservatory.

Following her graduation Belousova was accepted to Berklee College of Music in Boston where she received her degree in film scoring. Belousova also holds a master's degree in film scoring at the University of California, Los Angeles.

Professional career

Film and television work 
Belousova has produced the score for thriller-drama television series The Mist, produced by The Weinstein Company, airs on Spike TV. The series is based on the horror novella of the same name by Stephen King. Reimagined for television by Christian Torpe, the show stars Frances Conroy, Alyssa Sutherland and Morgan Spector. Belousova has written and produced scores for films that premiered at South by Southwest, Cannes International Film Festival, Tribeca Film Festival, Melbourne International Animation Festival, Chicago International Children's Film Festival, Fort Lauderdale International Film Festival, etc. Some of her notable film credits include SXSW official selection M.F.A. directed by Natalia Leite starring Francesca Eastwood and Emmy nominee Clifton Collins Jr. and Like Me starring Addison Timlin and Larry Fessenden; Tribeca official selection Two-Bit Waltz starring Academy Award nominees William H. Macy and David Paymer, Rebecca Pidgeon, Clara Mamet and Jared Gilman, directed by Clara Mamet from executive producer David Mamet; The Boat Builder starring Emmy Award winner Christopher Lloyd and Golden Globe nominee Jane Kaczmarek; How Sarah Got Her Wings directed by Gary Entin and Edmund Entin starring Teen Choice Award nominee Derek Theler and Lindsey Gort; Christmas Trade starring MTV Movie Award winner William Baldwin and nominees Denise Richards and Tom Arnold. She is also known to be frequently collaborating with multi regional Emmy Award winning director Bobby Grubic.

As a recording artist Sonya can be heard on various soundtracks including Daniel Licht's Dexter Season 7 soundtrack.

Ballet 
In 2013 Belousova was commissioned by the Festival Ballet Providence, Rhode Island’s premiere professional ballet company, to write music for the new ballet Orchis in collaboration with award winning choreographer Viktor Plotnikov. I listen to the music, what it tells me…and I have the piece, — Plotnikov, to Rhode Island Public Radio.The ballet premiered on March 8, 2013 at the Veterans Memorial Auditorium along with Agon by Igor Stravinsky. Described as "a big hit" and "stunning collaboration" Orchis returned to stage again the following season as a part of the Boundless Plotnkov program. "Audiences were blown away by the eccentric, wide range of Sonya Belousova's original score, striking a rich parallel to Viktor Plotnikov’s unique choreography". In recognition of Belousova's many achievements as a composer and pianist "both in her native Russia and throughout the international music world", she received an honorary citation from the Mayor of Providence. 

In 2014 Belousova was commissioned for another ballet, Surrogate. It premiered on November 1, 2014 as part of the Festival Ballet's Up Close On Hope series. "Accompanied by Sonya Belousova’s techno sounding original score, this thought-provoking piece questions whether we have all become 'surrogates,' unable to think and act for ourselves. Wearing tutus, three female dancers are accompanied by their male partners who move them about by grabbing hold of their ponytails." — Motif Magazine, describing the ballet.

The House of Bernarda Alba premiered on March 4, 2016 and is an adaptation of Federico García Lorca's play popular in theatrical settings but rarely performed as a ballet. "There is very little that is pretty about this piece, but it is thoroughly compelling. The movements are large, but awkward, and the daughters almost resemble marionettes manipulated by their controlling matriarch. Despite this, there is nothing that feels cartoonish, thanks in large part to the fantastic original score by Sonya Belousova. The visuals, dance and music all come together to create something that will linger in the viewer's mind for a long time." – Broadway World, describing the ballet.

Player Piano 

Belousova received wide public recognition for her music project Player Piano created in collaboration with director and screenwriter Tom Grey. Player Piano was first introduced in 2013 as Cosplay Piano from executive producer Stan Lee on Stan Lee’s World of Heroes YouTube Channel. In late 2014 Belousova and Grey formed Player Piano. To date Player Piano has totaled over 18 million views, received multiple awards and has been widely covered by various media outlets including MTV, Forbes, The Examiner, USA Today, Entertainment Weekly, The Huffington Post, Mashable, Daily Dot, CNET, Digital Trends, Moviepilot, Classical MPR, Jezebel, etc.

Belousova composed, produced and performed her original arrangements ranging from virtuosic solo piano to large ensembles, often reimagining the original music themes and giving them "a new unique spin". Grey directed and produced the music videos. 

In an interview with The Mary Sue Belousova said:Just covering note-by-note someone’s music doesn’t particularly appeal to me as a composer. When our fans click on our video, they never know what to expect from it. It’s like opening a present, there’s an element of surprise. Moreover, I’m incredibly happy to have Tom as my partner in Player Piano. It’s just a perfect combination of me being in charge of all the music production and him dealing with all the video aspects to achieve great results.

In 2013 Belousova appeared at the San Diego Comic Con and performed her original solo piano arrangements, which opened her panel with Stan Lee. In 2014 she was invited as a soloist to perform her arrangements for a 70-piece orchestra, 30-piece choir featuring solo piano at a sold-out crowd at the Anime Expo.

Collaboration with Jorge Calandrelli 

Belousova is known for her collaboration with 27 time Grammy 2 time Academy Award nominated producer, arranger and composer Jorge Calandrelli who described her as "one of the most talented young musicians I have met". Calandrelli is producing Belousova's album, which features her performing the piano pieces written by Calandrelli. The album will also include Belousova's duet with Tom Ranier performing Calandrelli's famous concerto for jazz clarinet. The recording sessions have begun at Capitol Records.

Belousova first collaborated with Calandrelli on Roberto Iarussi's 2013 Album I Believe recorded by the London Symphony Orchestra. In 2014 Belousova arranged and orchestrated Jingle Bells, Panis Angelicus and All Creatures of God for the upcoming Mario Frangoulis’s album Tales of Christmas, as well as provided electronic arrangements for Carpe Diem and Nature Boy. The album was recorded by the London Philharmonic Orchestra at Abbey Road Studios and features duets with Grammy Award winners Sarah Brightman and Marilyn Horne, and George Perris. Belousova is also featured on the album as a pianist for Jingle Bells and Panis Angelicus.

In 2014, Belousova performed Calandrelli’s piano pieces at the ASMAC Golden Score Awards honoring Maestro Calandrelli and Academy Award winning composer Michael Giacchino. Special guests for the event included: Grammy winner Arturo Sandoval, Grammy winner Walter Afanasieff, Grammy winner Kenny G, Grammy nominee Christian Jacob, Grammy nominee Calabria Foti, Tom Ranier, etc.

Awards and nominations

Works

Films and television

Ballet

References

External links
 Official website
 

1990 births
Living people
Berklee College of Music alumni
American film score composers
American women film score composers
Gnessin State Musical College alumni
Musicians from Los Angeles
Russian pianists
Russian women pianists
Russian composers
University of California, Los Angeles alumni
American women classical pianists
American classical pianists
21st-century American women pianists
21st-century classical pianists
21st-century American pianists
Russian emigrants to the United States
Musicians from Saint Petersburg